Myrothecium roridum is a fungal plant pathogen. Myrotoxin B has been isolated from it.

References

Fungal plant pathogens and diseases
Stachybotryaceae
Fungi described in 1790